The Ipiutak site is a large archaeological site at Point Hope in northwest Alaska, United States. It is one of the most important discoveries in this area, competing only with Ekven, Russia.

It is the type site for the Ipiutak culture, which arose possibly as early as 100–200 BCE and collapsed around 800 CE.  The Ipiutak culture occurred from south of the Bering Strait, across the Brooks Range and possibly as far north as Point Barrow.

The Ipiutak site was discovered in 1939 by archaeologists Helge Larsen and Froelich Rainey, who completed a monograph on the site in 1948.  The site consists of nearly 600 abandoned house depressions along four beach ridges that impart a linearity that was originally interpreted as purposeful design as roads or "avenues."  Many of the houses are too close to be contemporaneous and the range of several radiocarbon ages suggests a duration of 300–400 years to build all of the houses.   Archaeologists have modeled the population history of the site to infer that only about 125–200 people lived at the site during any one generation and occupied 20 to 30 houses.  The original population estimates of over 4000 are in error.

Excavations in 1940 and 1941 produced sizable collections from 74 square driftwood constructed houses and over 120 burials, now archived within three museums: the National Museum of Denmark, the American Museum of Natural History and the University of Alaska Fairbanks.

The site is renowned for its mortuary offerings, one of which is termed a "mask."  One Point Hope Ipiutak mask represents a human face with a gaping mouth and blowfly larvae issuing from its nostrils; a symbol pregnant with shamanistic meaning. A very similar "maskoid" is reported from Deering, that is dated between 600 and 800 CE. A variety of open work ivory carvings, engraved with iron burins, are renowned for their figurative representations that include polar bears, loons, seals, and (rarely) humans.  Ipiutak houses contain evidence of military and craft specialization in working walrus tusk, while a number of graves show evidence of violence associated with warfare.

Two technological hallmarks of Ipiutak culture are its very finely crafted stone tools used in arrow points and its lack of ceramics. The Ipiutak culture is defined by a distinctive linear, circle and dot aesthetic, that closely resembles the Old Bering Sea culture, which is restricted to Bering Strait and adjacent Siberia.  Ipiutak is contemporaneous with the later phases of Old Bering Sea and very likely had had political, economic and social ties with it.   The original excavators, Larsen and Rainey, linked the Ipiutak open work animal carving style with the distant and Scthyo-Siberian cultures of the Ukraine, but little data support this supposition.  Instead, Ipiutak closely resembles the widespread pan Alaska Norton culture, which did use ceramics and relied on salmon fishing.   The subsistence basis of Ipiutak was sea mammal hunting, most importantly of ringed seal and walrus, although caribou hunting was also crucial.

The site was declared a National Historic Landmark in 1961 and was added to the National Register of Historic Places in 1966.

Several other sites have also been linked to Ipiutak: at Cape Krusenstern, Itivlik Lake, Hahanudan Lake, Feniak Lake, Onion Portage Archeological District, and Anaktuvuk Pass, Alaska. The culture is noted for the elaborateness of its artwork, which seems to be an ancestor of Inuit art. It is still unclear why the Ipiutak apparently did not hunt whale or make pottery, considering that they lived in highly developed settlements.

See also 
Birnirk culture
Ekven
Iñupiat
Norton tradition
Tikiġaġmiut
List of National Historic Landmarks in Alaska
National Register of Historic Places listings in North Slope Borough, Alaska

References

National Historic Landmarks in Alaska
North Slope Borough, Alaska
Archaeological sites on the National Register of Historic Places in Alaska
Archaeological type sites
History of indigenous peoples of North America
National Register of Historic Places in North Slope Borough, Alaska